John M. Kindig (died 17 September 1869) was a Union Army soldier in the American Civil War who received the U.S. military's highest decoration, the Medal of Honor.

Kindig was born in the Pittsburgh suburb of East Liberty, and entered service at Wilkins Township, Pennsylvania. He was awarded the Medal of Honor, for extraordinary heroism shown in Spotsylvania County, Virginia, for capturing the flag of the Confederate States Army's 28th North Carolina Infantry during the Battle of Spotsylvania Court House, while serving as a corporal with Company A, 63rd Pennsylvania Infantry. His Medal of Honor was issued on May 12, 1864.

Kindig passed from tuberculosis on November 17, 1869 and was buried in historic Allegheny Cemetery in Pittsburgh.

Medal of Honor citation

References

External links

Date of birth unknown
Year of birth unknown
1869 deaths
19th-century American people
American Civil War recipients of the Medal of Honor
Military personnel from Pittsburgh
Union Army officers
United States Army Medal of Honor recipients
Burials at Allegheny Cemetery